The Clifton Trio is a homebuilt midget air racer built in the early 1950s.

Design and development
The Clifton Trio was built from salvaged parts and tubing.

The Clifton Trio is a single seat, conventional landing geared, strut-braced, low-wing aircraft using steel tube construction with aircraft fabric covering. It was first built as an open cockpit aircraft and was modified for an enclosed canopy.

Specifications (Clifton Trio)

References

Homebuilt aircraft